Quay is an unincorporated community and census-designated place (CDP) located on the boundary line between Pawnee and Payne counties in the U.S. state of Oklahoma. The population was 47 at the 2000 census, when it was still a town; the community disincorporated on August 23, 2000. No population was recorded in the census of 2010.

History
This community was originally named Lawson, for the townsite owner, Stonewall J. Lawson. A post office was established here January 17, 1894. The post office was renamed Quay in honor of Pennsylvania Senator Matthew Quay on February 24, 1903. Initially, Quay was an agricultural center. The discovery of oil nearby caused the population to mushroom from about one hundred to about four thousand during the early 1920s. Oil production dried up and the town population declined to 186 at the 1930 census. The post office closed in 1957 and the school closed in 1965.

Geography
According to the United States Census Bureau, the town had a total area of 0.2 square miles (0.5 km2), all land.

Demographics

As of the census of 2000, there were 47 people, 15 households, and 15 families residing in the town. The population density was 250.5 people per square mile (95.5/km2). There were 20 housing units at an average density of 106.6 per square mile (40.6/km2). The racial makeup of the town was 87.23% White, 2.13% Native American, and 10.64% from two or more races.

There were 15 households, out of which 46.7% had children under the age of 18 living with them, 86.7% were married couples living together, 6.7% had a female householder with no husband present, and 0.0% were non-families. No households were made up of individuals, and none had someone living alone who was 65 years of age or older. The average household size was 3.13 and the average family size was 3.13.

In the town the population was spread out, with 25.5% under the age of 18, 8.5% from 18 to 24, 25.5% from 25 to 44, 34.0% from 45 to 64, and 6.4% who were 65 years of age or older. The median age was 38 years. For every 100 females, there were 113.6 males. For every 100 females age 18 and over, there were 94.4 males.

The median income for a household in the town was $23,438, and the median income for a family was $24,063. Males had a median income of $26,875 versus $0 for females. The per capita income for the town was $9,736. There were 13.3% of families and 25.0% of the population living below the poverty line, including 80.0% of under eighteens and none of those over 64.

Employed residents commute to work, primarily in Stillwater.

Quay disincorporated in August 2000, and no 2010 census figures were recorded.

Notes

References

Unincorporated communities in Pawnee County, Oklahoma
Unincorporated communities in Payne County, Oklahoma
Unincorporated communities in Oklahoma
Census-designated places in Pawnee County, Oklahoma
Census-designated places in Payne County, Oklahoma
Census-designated places in Oklahoma
Populated places established in 1894
Populated places disestablished in 2000
Former municipalities in Oklahoma